Blue Balliett (born 1955 in New York) is an American author, who lives with her husband, three children, a grandson, and a cat. She is best known for her award-winning novel for children, Chasing Vermeer. She was born Elizabeth Balliett, but her family started calling her Blue shortly after her birth.

Chasing Vermeer, released by Scholastic Press in 2004, is her best-known and most highly praised book. Illustrated by Brett Helquist, it concerns the fictitious theft of a painting by 17th-century Dutch artist Jan Vermeer.  The book was a bestseller and won a number of accolades and awards, including the 2005 Edgar Award in the Best Juvenile category. In addition, she was awarded the Agatha Award in 2004 in the category Best Children's or Young Adult.

A sequel, The Wright 3, was released in April, 2006, and a third, The Calder Game, was published two years later, in April 2008. The Danger Box was published in August 2010. Her next book, Hold Fast was published in 2013. Soon after, in 2015, Balliett published Pieces and Players. Out of the Wild Night was published in 2018. Balliett has also published two oral histories involving Nantucket ghost stories in the 1980s, which have been consolidated into one book, "Nantucket Ghosts" released by Down East Books in 2006.

Before releasing Chasing Vermeer, she taught third grade at the University of Chicago Laboratory Schools.  During her tenure, she coordinated with NASA astronaut and University of Chicago  alumnus John M. Grunsfeld (S.M., '84, Ph.D., '88) to send her pupils' literature and creative artwork into space during a routine Hubble Space Telescope mission on the Columbia space shuttle.

References

External links
Official Web Site
Interview Scholastic

1955 births
Living people
American children's writers
Edgar Award winners
Writers from New York City
Writers from Chicago
Agatha Award winners
American women children's writers
American women novelists
21st-century American novelists
21st-century American women writers
Novelists from New York (state)
Novelists from Illinois